Ulverston is a railway station on the Furness Line, which runs between  and . It is owned by Network Rail and managed by Northern Trains.

History
Three years later the Ulverstone and Lancaster Railway opened the line southwards to Carnforth via Arnside and built a new through station on the current site, which opened on 1 September 1857, leaving the old FR terminus to be used as a goods depot. The Furness Railway then took over the Ulverstone and Lancaster company in 1862.

The current buildings are architecturally noteworthy and date from 1873, when they were rebuilt as befitting one of the main stations of the Furness Railway. The clock tower and glass awnings and supporting decorative ironwork, now extensively restored and repainted, are particularly fine. The passenger waiting room retains many period features.

The unusual platform layout (where the northbound line has a face on both sides) is a legacy of the station's former role as the interchange for the branch line to Lakeside, which diverged from the main line at Plumpton Junction a few miles to the south before heading north-eastwards through Greenodd and Haverthwaite, to its terminus at Lakeside on the southern shore of Windermere. The island platform allowed easy cross-platform interchange for those passengers travelling from the south changing onto the connecting service to Lakeside whilst those wishing to exit the station could do so by alighting on the opposite side platform. Today only platforms one and three are used.

The branch opened on 1 June 1869, and was well-patronised from the outset in the summer months by tourists, who could make a convenient transfer to the Windermere steamboats at Lakeside. The line was much quieter in winter though and year-round services ended in the autumn of 1938 – passenger trains thereafter running only during the summer. This continued until 6 September 1965, when the line fell victim to the Beeching Axe.

The line's northern end was subsequently reopened on 2 May 1973, as the Lakeside and Haverthwaite Railway. However, the remainder was lifted in the early 1970s, and the trackbed used for improvements to the A590 road (over which passengers must continue their journey if heading to Lakeside today).

Facilities
The station is fully staffed throughout the week (except in the late evening); the booking office and waiting room is located in the main building on platform 1 and a ticket machine is also available in this building.

In 2007 new digital information screens were installed allowing passengers to see the status and timing of their train. Help points and an automated PA system are also provided. The platforms are linked by a subway, but there is no step-free access to either platform.

Services

There is normally one train per hour in each direction to Barrow and Lancaster on Monday to Saturday daytimes (with some peak period extras) ). A few through trains each day beyond Barrow to Carlisle via Whitehaven and one to Millom (connections for Cumbrian Coast stations are available at Barrow at other times). Southbound, a number of services continue through to Preston and Manchester Airport. A similar service operates on Sundays, with trains to Carlisle now running (since the summer 2018 timetable change – the first time such trains have operated since 1976).

See also
Listed buildings in Ulverston

Notes

References

Sources

External links 

 
 

Ulverston
Railway stations in Cumbria
DfT Category E stations
Former Furness Railway stations
Former Ulverston and Lancaster Railway stations
Railway stations in Great Britain opened in 1857
Northern franchise railway stations
Clock towers in the United Kingdom
Grade II listed buildings in Cumbria
Grade II listed railway stations
1857 establishments in England